Lam Uk Tsuen is a village in Wang Chau, Yuen Long District, Hong Kong.

Administration
Lam Uk Tsuen is a recognized village under the New Territories Small House Policy. It is one of the 37 villages represented within the Ping Shan Rural Committee. For electoral purposes, Lam Uk Tsuen is part of the Ping Shan North constituency.

See also
 I Shing Temple

References

External links

 Delineation of area of existing village Lam Uk Tsuen (Ping Shan) for election of resident representative (2019 to 2022)

Villages in Yuen Long District, Hong Kong
Wang Chau (Yuen Long)